The Horohoro Fault is in the old Taupō Rift of the central North Island of New Zealand.

Geology
Just south of Lake Rotorua, Horohoro mountain has very high cliffs in an apparent fault scarp that defines the western edge of the lower lying Paeroa Garben and its northern Kapenga Caldera. The  Paeroa Garben's eastern edge is defined by the Paeroa Fault. The cliffs are composed of Mamaku ignimbrite from the Rotorua Caldera eruption and older ignimbrites and Rotorua rhyolite. This fault area of the Taupō Rift is controversial as the components of historic tectonic and volcanic contribution have led to debate. The northern portion for the last 20,000 years is displacing at a low rate of up to 0.2 mm/yr but it is unknown if the southern portion is active. The far northern portion passes through the Hemo Gorge which may have been created by a flood event soon after the creation of the Rotorua caldera, with only later drainage of the caldera being established towards the Bay of Plenty. What is known is that the fault has displaced historically at a much higher rate before the last Taupō Hatepe eruption. It has also been speculated that the modern Taupō Rifts far west edge is actually this fault line although most think this is more to the east, along the line of the Paeroa Fault. It has also been speculated that the northern part of the fault is actually the western edge of the Kapenga Caldera.

Risks
This intra-rift fault has been estimated to have single event earthquakes in its northern portion up to about 6.5 Mw every 5000 to 7000 years. The time of the last fault rupture was after 8000 years ago but before the Hatepe eruption.

References

Seismic faults of New Zealand
Taupō Volcanic Zone